Stare Budy Osieckie  is a village in the administrative district of Gmina Siemiątkowo, within Żuromin County, Masovian Voivodeship, in east-central Poland.

The village has an approximate population of 60.

References

Stare Budy Osieckie